Siplizumab (MEDI-507) is a novel monoclonal antibody with a human IgG1, kappa directed to CD2. The agent has shown potent immunomodulatory effects, selectively suppressing the function of T and NK cells, and is currently being tested as a possible treatment for psoriasis and in the prevention of graft-versus-host disease.

References 

Monoclonal antibodies